Hemisarcoptidae is a family of mites belonging to the order Sarcoptiformes.

Genera:
 Congovidia Fain & Elsen, 1971
 Espeletiacarus Fain, 1987
 Giardius Perraud, 1897
 Hemisarcoptes Lignières, 1893

References 

Acari